The Progo River is a river in southern central Java, Indonesia. The river passes through two provinces; Central Java and Yogyakarta Special Region. The source of the river is on the slopes of Mount Sindoro, Central Java.

Hydrology 
The river runs to the southeast through the city of  Magelang, then through the historical Kedu Plain passing near the well known Borobudur,  Mendut, and Pawon temples. Reaching the province of Yogyakarta the river forms a natural boundary between Sleman Regency, Kulon Progo Regency and Bantul Regency. The mouth of the river is located at Trisik beach on the southern shore of Java facing Indian Ocean.

Geography
The river flows in the southwest area of Java with predominantly tropical monsoon climate (designated as Am in the Köppen-Geiger climate classification). The annual average temperature in the area is 24 °C. The warmest month is January, when the average temperature is around 27 °C, and the coldest is July, at 23 °C. The average annual rainfall is 2970 mm. The wettest month is January, with an average of 537 mm rainfall, and the driest is September, with 22 mm rainfall.

See also
List of rivers of Java
List of rivers of Indonesia

References

Rivers of Central Java
Rivers of Yogyakarta
Rivers of Indonesia